Mehdi Salim Khalil (born 19 September 1991) is a professional footballer who plays as a goalkeeper for  club Ahed and the Lebanon national team. Khalil is known as "the Mountain" because of his height.

Khalil started his senior career in Sierra Leone at Johansen, before moving to Sweden in 2011, first playing at Koping FF before transferring to Djurgården. Following his experience in Sweden, Khalil moved back to his native country, at Kallon, before joining Lebanese club Safa in 2013. After spending four years at the club, Khalil moved to Lebanese Premier League reigning champions Ahed in 2017. He won the 2019 AFC Cup with the side, the first in Lebanese history, as the competition's Most Valuable Player. In 2020, Khalil moved to Iranian side Zob Ahan on a six-month loan.

Born in Sierra Leone to Lebanese parents, Khalil was called up to represent his native country at youth level, without featuring. He has represented Lebanon at senior level since 2013. Khalil played at the 2018 and 2022 FIFA World Cup qualification, and was Lebanon's main goalkeeper at the 2019 AFC Asian Cup.

Early life 
Born in Bouaké, Ivory Coast to Lebanese parents, Khalil moved to Freetown, Sierra Leone with his family at a young age. He started playing six-a-side football, a popular form of football in Sierra Leone, at age 12 at Young Sportsmen Club as a defender. Noticing his physical attributes, namely his height, Khalil's coach advised him to switch position to goalkeeper. At age 15, he moved to Johansen to play football.

Club career

2009–2012: Sierra Leone and Sweden 
Khalil began his senior career in Sierra Leone in 2009 at Johansen, a club founded by Norwegian couple Isha and Arne Johansen. In 2010, Khalil played for Kallon U19 at the Viareggio Cup, an annual youth tournament held in Italy; he played in two of the three games.

Thanks to his Scandinavian connections, in March 2011 Khalil joined Swedish Division 3 side Köping FF on a three-month loan. Talking about his first training session at the club, Khalil said that "[it] was fun [...] the guys seem lovely, and many of them are young, just like me". He played seven games for the club. Between April and June 2011, Khalil trained with Allsvenskan clubs AIK and Trelleborg.

On 20 July 2011, Khalil moved to Djurgården, AIK's rivals, on a four-month loan. He had been noticed by the club's manager Magnus Pehrsson the previous year at a friendly tournament in Ghana; Khalil was named best goalkeeper of the tournament. On 1 August 2011, he made his debut for the club's under-21 team in the  against Brage, helping his side win 5–1. On 25 October 2011, Djurgården announced that Khalil's contract would not be renewed.

Following his experience in Sweden, Khalil moved back to Sierra Leone, playing for Kallon during the 2011–12 season.

2013–2017: Safa 
Through his links with Roda Antar, a Sierra Leonean-born Lebanese footballer, Khalil moved to Safa in the Lebanese Premier League in January 2013. He signed a three-and-a-half-year contract in a deal worth $20,000. Initially a reserve for Ziad Al Samad, Khalil became Safa's first choice goalkeeper from his third season at the club.

Khalil did not play in the league in his first season (2012–13). His debut came during the 2013 AFC Cup, playing in a group stage game against Riffa on 2 April 2013; the match ended in a 1–0 win. On 24 April 2013, Khalil was sent off against Regar-TadAZ in the 79th minute, with the opposing team scoring from the subsequent penalty kick. However, Safa still won the encounter 3–2 through a 92nd-minute goal by Mohamad Haidar. In Khalil's first experience in the AFC Cup he played three matches, finishing third in the group.

Khalil's league debut came in the 2013–14 season, on 23 November 2013, in a 5–0 win over Tadamon Sour. He participated in the 2014 AFC Cup, playing two games. Khalil became the club's starter from the 2014–15 season, playing 17 league games. In the 2015–16 season, Khalil played 16 league games, helping Safa win their second league title. He was included in the 2015–16 Lebanese Premier League Team of the Season for his performances.

Following the expiration of his contract in mid-2016, Khalil tried out with several Eerste Divisie teams in the Netherlands. He remained with Safa for one more year, playing 16 games in the league during the 2016–17 season. He also made two appearances in the 2017 AFC Cup. In five seasons at the Beirut-based club, Khalil won two league titles (2012–13 and 2015–16), one FA Cup (2013–14), and one Super Cup (2013).

2017–2020: Ahed 

In July 2017, Khalil moved to Lebanese Premier League holders Ahed, for a fee of around $250,000. Khalil quickly asserted himself as the team's first-choice goalkeeper, playing 18 league games in the 2017–18 season. He helped his team win the domestic treble—the league title, cup, and Super Cup. Khalil was Ahed's goalkeeper at the 2018 AFC Cup, playing eight games and reaching the zonal semi-finals, where they lost to Al-Quwa Al-Jawiya 5–3 on aggregate. In his first season at the club, Khalil was included in the 2017–18 Lebanese Premier League Team of the Season as the league's best goalkeeper.

His next season with the team was also successful, as he won his second domestic treble. He played 21 league games in the 2018–19 season. Khalil featured in the 2018–19 Lebanese Premier League Team of the Season. On 4 November 2019, after beating April 25 in the final, he won the 2019 AFC Cup as the competition's Most Valuable Player. Conceding just three goals in 11 matches, Khalil kept nine clean sheets (of which five were consecutive in the knock-out stages) as Ahed went unbeaten throughout the whole tournament. The 2019 AFC Cup win was the first for a Lebanese club.

2020: Loan to Zob Ahan 

On 7 January 2020, Khalil joined Persian Gulf Pro League side Zob Ahan on a six-month loan, reuniting him with former Lebanon national team coach Miodrag Radulović. He cited the conditions in his country and the ambiguity surrounding the resumption of sports activity as the reasons for the transfer. Khalil became the fourth Lebanese player to play for the Iranian side, after Walid Ismail, Ali Hamam, and Rabih Ataya.

He made his league debut for Zob Ahan on 25 January 2020 against Pars Jonoubi Jam; despite being booked in the 64th minute, Khalil kept a clean sheet, helping his side win 1–0 at home. In Khalil's third game, on 7 February 2020, he again kept a 1–0 clean sheet against Sanat Naft, while being booked in the 89th minute. Thanks to his performances in the two fixtures, Khalil was included in the Team of the Week on both occasions. Khalil finished the 2019–20 season with eight games.

2020–present: Return to Ahed 
Despite Zob Ahan extending Khalil's loan for an additional year on 27 June 2020, Khalil returned to Ahed as their first-choice goalkeeper. In the first matchday of the 2020–21 season on 4 October 2020, he helped Ahed win 3–2 over Bourj. Khalil played 12 league games, helping Ahed to a fourth-place finish with four clean sheets. He also played a game in the 2021 Lebanese Elite Cup, which Ahed won.

Due to an ACL injury he sustained while training with the Lebanon national team in August 2021, Khalil was sidelined for six months. He did not feature for Ahed during the 2021–22 season. Khalil returned to action as Ahed's first-choice goalkeeper in the first matchday of the 2022–23 season, against Akhaa Ahli Aley on 4 September 2022. He had played his previous league game 16 months prior, also against Akhaa, on 23 April 2021. On 28 October, Khalil saved a penalty and kept a clean sheet in a 1–0 league win against Tadamon Sour.

International career
Khalil was called up for Sierra Leone at the under-17 and under-20 levels, without featuring in any match. Eligible to represent Lebanon through his parents' nationality, Khalil opted to play for Lebanon's senior team in 2013.

Khalil made his debut for Lebanon in a 0–0 draw against Bahrain on 17 March 2013. He was part of the squad that played in the 2018 FIFA World Cup qualifiers between 2015 and 2016; initially Abbas Hassan's reserve for the first three matches, Khalil became Lebanon's first-choice goalkeeper in the final five games of the second round of qualification. Lebanon finished in second place in their group and, despite being eliminated from the World Cup, qualified them for to the final round of qualification for the 2019 AFC Asian Cup.

Drawn with North Korea, Hong Kong, and Malaysia, Khalil helped Lebanon finish top of the group unbeaten, conceding only four goals in six games. Lebanon reached the Asian Cup finals for the first time through qualification. Khalil was included on the 2019 AFC Asian Cup squad as Lebanon's main goalkeeper. In the first two group stage matches, Lebanon lost 2–0 to both Qatar and Saudi Arabia. Needing a win by four goals or more, Lebanon won 4–1 against North Korea for the first time in their history. However, the three points were not enough to qualify Lebanon for the knockout stage. Khalil played all 90 minutes in the three group stage games.

In the second round of qualifying for the 2022 FIFA World Cup, in a group with South Korea, North Korea, Turkmenistan and Sri Lanka, Khalil took part in all six of Lebanon's games. With three wins, one draw and two defeats, Lebanon finished second in their group and qualified to the final qualification round for the World Cup for the second time in their history, and the finals of the 2023 AFC Asian Cup for the second time. On 20 August 2021, during a training session in view of the first qualification game against the United Arab Emirates, Khalil sustained an ACL injury, keeping him on the sidelines for six months. He was called back up to the national team in September 2022 for a training camp in Bnachii, Zgharta.

Style of play 
Known as "the Mountain" because of his height, Khalil is a goalkeeper with good reflexes and a large physical presence. He is a fine shot stopper, and has a tendency to punch balls away from crosses. In 2011 his agent Patrick Mörck described him as a "resilient, witty, and responsive goalkeeper", drawing similarities to Swedish former goalkeeper Andreas Isaksson. The same year Magnus Pehrsson, his coach at Djurgården, reaffirmed the similarities with Isaksson, noting "his size and his actions".

Personal life 
Khalil's younger brother, Hadi, is also footballer who plays as a goalkeeper. His uncle, Hussein Khalil, was also a footballer; he encouraged Mehdi to pursue football as more than a hobby. Khalil's favourite club is Manchester United, and his favourite player is former Manchester United goalkeeper Edwin van der Sar. Other than football, Khalil enjoys tennis and swimming.

On 11 January 2020, Khalil and his partner Myriam Damoury got married. Their son Selim was born on 24 May 2021.

Career statistics

International

Honours 
Safa
 Lebanese Premier League: 2012–13, 2015–16
 Lebanese FA Cup: 2013–14
 Lebanese Super Cup: 2013

Ahed
 AFC Cup: 2019
 Lebanese Premier League: 2017–18, 2018–19, 2021–22
 Lebanese FA Cup: 2017–18, 2018–19
 Lebanese Elite Cup: 2022; runner-up: 2021
 Lebanese Super Cup: 2017, 2018, 2019

Individual
 AFC Cup Most Valuable Player: 2019
 Lebanese Premier League Team of the Season: 2015–16, 2017–18, 2018–19

See also
 List of Lebanon international footballers
 List of Lebanon international footballers born outside Lebanon

Notes

References

External links

 
 Mehdi Khalil at Lagstatistik
 

1991 births
Living people
People from Bouaké
Sportspeople from Freetown
Lebanese footballers
Sierra Leonean footballers
Sierra Leonean people of Lebanese descent
Sportspeople of Lebanese descent
Association football goalkeepers
FC Johansen players
Lebanese expatriate footballers
Sierra Leonean expatriate footballers
Expatriate footballers in Sweden
Lebanese expatriate sportspeople in Sweden
Sierra Leonean expatriate sportspeople in Sweden
Djurgårdens IF Fotboll players
F.C. Kallon players
Sierra Leonean emigrants to Lebanon
Lebanese Premier League players
Safa SC players
Al Ahed FC players
Expatriate footballers in Iran
Lebanese expatriate sportspeople in Iran
Sierra Leonean expatriate sportspeople in Iran
Persian Gulf Pro League players
Zob Ahan Esfahan F.C. players
Lebanon international footballers
2019 AFC Asian Cup players
AFC Cup winning players